North Hertfordshire College ("NHC") is a further education and higher education college operating in Stevenage, Hitchin, and Letchworth Garden City. NHC was established on 1 April 1991, through the amalgamation of Stevenage College, Hitchin College and Letchworth Technical College. NHC is graded 'Good with Outstanding features' by Ofsted.

History
The college was established on 1 April 1991 when further education, in Hertfordshire, was reorganised. One of the institutions merged into the new college was Hitchin College of Further Education.

Campuses and Facilities
The College has two campuses in Stevenage, one in Hitchin, and an administrative centre in Letchworth Garden City.

Stevenage Centre
Her Majesty Queen Elizabeth II opened the Stevenage Centre in 2003. This centre is the largest campus and is home to learning childcare, General Certificate of Secondary Education subjects, Higher Education, health and social care, including science.

Engineering and Construction Campus
The Engineering and Construction Campus focuses on construction and building trade services, teaching courses such as carpentry, plumbing, electrical course offer, brickwork, engineering, and painting including decorating. In 2011, the centre expanded with a new welding course offer which was officially opened by Skills Minister, Matthew Hancock.

Hitchin Centre
The Hitchin Centre focuses on the learning of business, tourism and events, hair and beauty, catering, sport, public services as well as creative arts. As of 2012 to 2014, the centre underwent an extensive redevelopment.

Hart Salon
Hart Salon, based at the Hitchin Centre, offers hairdressing and beauty therapy services . The salon is staffed by qualified and learning students.

Sports Centre
The Sports Centre offers sport and fitness facilities to students and the public, including basketball courts, fitness studios, dance studios, a gym, and an all weather 3G football pitch.

Hart Kitchens
Hart Kitchens is a student run contemporary restaurant. Under the direction of a head chef, students design menus as well as prepare and serve food and drinks to customers, including a lunch menu as well as theme evenings throughout the year.

Airbus Foundation Discovery Space 
In January 2017, NHC and Airbus opened a Science, Technology, Engineering, and Mathematics education centre, the Airbus Foundation Discovery Space, which is backed and funded by the Airbus Foundation and the Hertfordshire LEP. The centre was opened by Astronaut, Tim Peake.

Grading
The College has been accredited with Investors in People Gold Award in 2012 and 2014.

In November 2017, NHC underwent an Ofsted inspection and received a Grade 2 (Good) for overall effectiveness of the provision. The effectiveness of the college's higher needs provision and traineeship were graded as Outstanding.

Notable alumni
NHC alumni include:
 Ed Westwick, actor
 George Boyd, footballer

References

External links
 North Hertfordshire College website
 
 
 
 
 

Hitchin
Buildings and structures in Hitchin
Stevenage
Further education colleges in Hertfordshire
Educational institutions established in 1991
1991 establishments in England